Micheál Richard Antonio Richardson (born 22 June 1995) is an Irish actor.

Career
After appearing alongside Natalie Portman in 2018 film Vox Lux, Richardson insisted on auditioning for a role in Cold Pursuit (2019), a film in which his father Liam Neeson was starring, and a remake of the 2014 Norwegian crime thriller In Order of Disappearance. Richardson successfully auditioned for the role of Neeson's character's son. Richardson also starred in Made in Italy (2020), a film about grief and familial relationships, again alongside his father. Both father and son were touched by the script by James D’Arcy and the parallels with their own experiences with grief.

In 2015, Richardson was cast as Irish revolutionary leader Michael Collins in the film The Rising: 1916 about the 1916 Easter Rising in Ireland. Collins was portrayed by Richardson's father in Neil Jordan's 1996 film, Michael Collins. He is set to appear alongside Colin Morgan as Seán Mac Diarmada, Fiona Shaw as Countess Markievicz, and David O'Hara as James Connolly.

Personal life
Richardson was born on 22 June 1995, in Dublin, Ireland. He comes from a long line of actors. His parents are the actors Liam Neeson and Natasha Richardson. He was christened Micheál Neeson, but changed his surname in 2018, with his father's blessing, to honour his late mother. Through his mother he is a member of the Redgrave family. He is the grandson of actress Vanessa Redgrave and filmmaker Tony Richardson, the nephew of actress Joely Richardson, and the cousin of actress Daisy Bevan.

Filmography

Film

Television

References

External links

1995 births
Living people
Irish emigrants to the United States
Irish male film actors
Irish male television actors
Irish people of English descent
Male actors from County Dublin
Redgrave family
21st-century Irish male actors